In Zulu mythology, Tikoloshe, Tikolosh, Tokoloshe, Tokolotshe, Thokolosi or Hili is a dwarf-like water sprite. It is a mischievous and evil spirit that can become invisible by drinking water or swallowing a stone. Tokoloshes are called upon by malevolent people to cause trouble for others. At its least harmful, a tokoloshe can be used to scare children, but its power extends to causing illness or even the death of the victim. The creature might be banished by a pastor (especially with an apostolic calling), who has the power to expel it from the area. It is also considered a part of superstition and is often used in a satirical manner as a reference to overcome.

Mythology 
The advent of the phantom Tokoloshe came about through Bantu folklore to explain why people inexplicably died while sleeping in their rondavels at night. Traditionally, these people slept on the floor on grass mats encircling a wood fire that kept them warm during sub-freezing cold winter nights on the highveld in the rarefied air. They never realized the fire was depleting the oxygen levels, leaving noxious carbon monoxide, which is heavier than pure air and sinks to the bottom. Eventually it was realized that anyone who happened to be sleeping in an elevated position escaped the deadly curse of Tokoloshe, which was described as a short man about hip high who randomly stole one's life in the night unless they were lifted to the height of their bed. 

"Some Zulu people (and other southern African tribes) are still superstitious when it comes to things like the supposedly fictional tokoloshe—a hairy creature created by a witch doctor to harm his enemies (also … known to bite off sleeping people's toes)."

According to legend, the only way to keep the Tokoloshe away at night is to put a few bricks beneath each leg of one's bed.

Creation
The client – usually a jealous person – will approach an evil witch doctor to take vengeance on someone. The client has to promise the soul of a loved one, but cannot choose who, as the Tikoloshe will choose the soul it decides to take. The witch doctor locates a dead body to be possessed, piercing the eye sockets and brain with a hot iron rod so that it cannot think for itself, and sprinkling it with a special powder, shrinking the body. The Tikoloshe is then let loose to terrorise its target, taking its payment of the soul of the client's loved one weeks, months, or maybe years later.

In popular culture
Running gags about Tokoloshes are common in the South African daily comic strip Madam & Eve.
"Tokoloshe Man" was a pop hit by John Kongos, later covered by Happy Mondays and released on the Elektra compilation album Rubáiyát.
The video for Die Antwoord's song "Evil Boy" features a Tokoloshe.
 Tokoloshe is mentioned several times in film The Bone Snatcher (2003) by Titus when the team encountered an ant-like demonic creature.
"Hosh Tokoloshe" is a pop/rap song influenced by the Tokoloshe by South African rapper Jack Parow.
 Belief in the Tikoloshe is a major part of Gavin Hood's film A Reasonable Man.
 Serial killer Elifasi Msomi claimed to have been influenced by a tokoloshe.
 A tokoloshe appears in every episode of the third series of the British TV show Mad Dogs, although only one character can see it, and it is left unclear as to whether it is real or a hallucination. At one point, the characters are told that if you see a Tokoloshe, it means somebody will die.
 Tokoloshe is the full name of Tok, the mascot for the English surfing and clothing company Saltrock.
 DJ and musician Steve "Toshk" Shelley got his stagename as a derivation of Tokoloshe
In Gene's Wolfe's "The Shadow of the Torturer," Severian is considered to be a tokoloshe by the Zulu shaman, Isangoma, he encounters in an aerial hut in the Botanic Gardens.

See also
 Anchimayen
 Tupilaq

References

Further reading
 "Mind, gender, and culture: A critical evaluation of the phenomenon of Tokoloshe "sightings" among prepubescent girls in Kwazulu-Natal" by Nhlanhla Mkhize, University of Natal, Pietermaritzburg
 
 
 Karen Elizabeth Flint, Healing Traditions: African Medicine, Cultural Exchange, and Competition in South Africa, 1820-1948, University of Kwazulu-Natal Press, 2008

External links
 "Evil Boy (music video) by Die Antwoord, featuring a depiction of the Tikoloshe throughout the video" music video
 "Killer’s belief in omens, spirits led to attack on toddler", news story 
 "Man who cried 'tokoloshe' guilty of murder", news story
 "Tales of the Tokoloshe", book
 "Tokeloshe", Sci Fi Channel website 
Oh, Diamond, Diamond, thou little knowest the mischief thou hast done!, South African artists' film featuring an impression of the Tokoloshe 
 "The Flame's Burden", book

Zulu legendary creatures
Xhosa culture
Dwarves (folklore)
South African ghosts
Sprites (folklore)